Tajuan Agee (born November 12, 1997) is an American professional basketball player for Rasta Vechta of the German ProA. He played college basketball for Iona and Tyler Junior College.

Early life and high school career
Agee grew up in Chicago and grew up playing baseball and football. He did not start playing organized basketball until eighth grade and expanded his game by playing in an alley. Agee attended Hyde Park Academy High School, where he stood 6'0 as a freshman and played against Jabari Parker. Agee grew three inches every year in high school and switched from being a guard to a forward. As a senior, he averaged 20 points and 12 rebounds per game and earned All-City and All-State honors.

College career
After high school, Agee played at Tyler Junior College for two years. He transferred to Iona despite it not being his first choice. Agee averaged 13.2 points per game and led the MAAC in rebounding with 8.0 per game, earning Third Team All-MAAC honors. On February 29, 2020, Agee scored a career-high 28 points and collected eight rebounds in a 101–91 loss to Niagara. As a senior, he averaged 14.7 points, 7.2 rebounds and three assists per game, shooting 38 percent from three-point range. He was named to the Second Team All-MAAC.

Professional career
On July 8, 2020, Agee signed with BC Balkan Botevgrad of the Bulgarian National Basketball League.

Agee initially signed with Maccabi Haifa of the Israeli National League for the 2021–22 season, but then joined Maccabi Ashdod/Be'er Tuvia for a two-game stint in October 2021. On November 11, 2021, he signed with SC Rasta Vechta of the German ProA.

On May 26, 2022, Agee signed with the Hawke's Bay Hawks for the rest of the 2022 New Zealand NBL season.

On June 13, 2022, he signed an extension with Rasta Vechta of the German ProA.

Personal life
Agee is the eldest of six siblings and has Jamaican heritage.

Agee is the nephew of Arthur Agee from the basketball documentary "Hoop Dreams".

References

External links
Iona Gaels bio

1997 births
Living people
American expatriate basketball people in Bulgaria
American expatriate basketball people in Germany
American expatriate basketball people in Israel
American expatriate basketball people in New Zealand
American men's basketball players
Basketball players from Chicago
BC Balkan Botevgrad players
Hawke's Bay Hawks players
Iona Gaels men's basketball players
Maccabi Ashdod B.C. players
Power forwards (basketball)
SC Rasta Vechta players
Tyler Apaches men's basketball players